Karl Wilhelm Berkhan (8 April 1915 in Hamburg – 9 March 1994 in Hamburg), also known as Willi Berkhan, was a German politician, representative of the Social Democratic Party.

See also
List of Social Democratic Party of Germany politicians

References

Social Democratic Party of Germany politicians
1915 births
1994 deaths
Military Ombudspersons in Germany